"Astronaut in the Ocean" is a song by Australian rapper Masked Wolf. It was originally released in June 2019 before being re-released through Elektra Records on 27 October 2020. Following its re-release, the song achieved chart success, peaking at number 4 on the Australian ARIA Charts and number 6 on the US Billboard Hot 100. It was released as the lead single from his mixtape Astronomical. The song was produced by Tyron Hapi.

In September 2021, the song was added to the APRA billion streams list for its achievement. At the 2021 ARIA Music Awards, the song was nominated for Song of the Year, Best Hip Hop Release and Breakthrough Artist - Release. Masked Wolf was nominated for Best Artist and Daniele Cernera was nominated for Best Video for their work on this release.

Background
The song was first released through Teamwrk Records on 7 June 2019, achieving minor success within Australia and becoming Masked Wolf's most popular single at the time. However, in late 2020, the track started to gain attention on social media by being used in a number of TikTok videos. He was  signed by Elektra Records in early 2021, and the song was re-released on 6 January 2021. By that time, the song had already reached more than 32 million streams on Spotify and was steadily gaining more traction through social media and clips on TikTok.

In February 2021, it surpassed the 100 million Spotify streams mark, becoming Teamwrk Records' most streamed track. The song was also included in the playlist "The Shazam Predictions 2021", compiled by Shazam and Apple Music. About the lyrics, the rapper said, "'Astronaut In The Ocean' touches on mental depression, how I was stuck in a place of anxiety and feeling low."

Remixes
The song has received many remixes, including that of Brazilian DJ Alok. The official remix features American rappers G-Eazy and DDG, and was released on May 7, 2021. In a press statement, Masked Wolf said:I've always wanted to do a remix of Astro, but it had to be right. The song means a lot to me so I really thought about who I wanted on it. As soon as I heard DDG on "Moonwalking", I was like, "I need this guy." He's so talented and I knew he would rip a crazy verse. I'm a huge fan of G-Eazy, and, sonically, he fits the song perfectly – he just has that swag about him, but can also talk about real things too.

Music video 

Astronaut In The Ocean" is a music video directed by Daniele Cernera, who also served as the director of photography, and 1st AC Sophian Ferey. The video was produced by Cerne Studios, based in Sydney, Australia and filmed at their studio in Sydney in under half a day.

The team at Cerne Studios used retro projection on a cyclorama to create the visual effects of space. The lighting design included an overhead softbox for backlight and ambient light, as well as RGB tubes for added color saturation. For the second set, a black backdrop and warm spotlight were used to create a smoky, ethereal look. The CGI effects were added by 180 Creative in Melbourne during the post-production process. The video premiered on October 27, 2020.

The video received widespread recognition for its creative and high-quality production value, with over 350 million views on YouTube and 2+ billion plays on digital platforms. It was nominated for Aria Awards 2021 for Best Video.

The simplicity of the visuals, along with the effective execution by the team at Cerne Studios, played a significant role in the video's success. Despite the limited budget and timeline, the team was able to create a visually striking and impactful video that resonated with audiences

Charts

Weekly charts

Year-end charts

Certifications

See also
List of Airplay 100 number ones of the 2020s

References

2019 songs
2019 singles
2021 singles
Masked Wolf songs
Internet memes introduced in 2021
Elektra Records singles
Number-one singles in Romania
Number-one singles in Russia
Songs about depression
Song recordings produced by Tyron Hapi
Songs written by Tyron Hapi
Songs written by Masked Wolf
Rap rock songs